Clothing industry or garment industry summarizes the types of trade and industry along the production and value chain of clothing and garments, starting with the textile industry (producers of cotton, wool, fur, and synthetic fibre), embellishment using embroidery, via the fashion industry to apparel retailers up to trade with second-hand clothes and textile recycling. The producing sectors build upon a wealth of clothing technology some of which, like the loom, the cotton gin, and the sewing machine heralded industrialization not only of the previous textile manufacturing practices. Clothing industries are also known as allied industries, fashion industries, garment industries, or soft good industries.

Terminology

By the early 20th century, the industry in the developed world often involved immigrants in "sweat shops", which were usually legal but were sometimes illegally operated. They employed people in crowded conditions, working manual sewing machines, and being paid less than a living wage.  This trend worsened due to attempts to protect existing industries which were being challenged by developing countries in South East Asia, the Indian subcontinent and Central America. Although globalization saw the manufacturing largely outsourced to overseas labor markets, there has been a trend for the areas historically associated with the trade to shift focus to the more white collar associated industries of fashion design, fashion modeling and retail. Areas historically involved heavily in the "rag trade" include London and Milan in Europe, and the SoHo district in New York City.

There are considerable overlaps between the terms clothing-/garment-, textile- and fashion industry. The clothing sector is concerned with all types of clothes, from fashion to uniforms, e-textiles and workwear. Textile industry is less concerned with the fashion aspect but produces the fabrics and fibres that are required for tailoring. The fashion industry closely follows - and sets - fashion trends to always supply the latest in non-functional clothing.

Production
The garment industry is a major contributor to the economies of many countries. The industry for Ready Made Garments has been criticized by labor advocates for the use of sweatshops, piece work and child labor.

Working conditions in low-cost countries have received critical media coverage, especially in the aftermath of large scale disasters like the 2013 Savar building collapse or the Triangle Shirtwaist Factory fire.

In 2016, the largest apparel exporting nations were China ($161 billion), Bangladesh ($28 billion), Vietnam ($25 billion), India ($18 billion), Hong Kong ($16 billion), Turkey ($15 billion) and Indonesia ($7 billion). By 2025, it is projected that the United States market will be worth $385 billion. It is also projected that the e-commerce revenue will be worth $146 billion in the United States by 2023.

Production in developing countries

The worldwide market for textiles and apparel exports in 2013 according to United Nations Commodity Trade Statistics Database stood at $772 billion.

In 2016, the largest apparel exporting nations were China ($161 billion), Bangladesh ($28 billion), Vietnam ($25 billion), India ($18 billion), Hong Kong ($16 billion), Turkey ($15 billion) and Indonesia ($7 billion).

Bangladesh

Many Western multinationals use labour in Bangladesh, which is one of the cheapest in the world: 30 euros per month compared to 150 or 200 in China. In April 2013, at least 1,135 garment factory workers died in the collapse of the Rana Plaza garment factory, Dhaka. Other fatal accidents due to unsanitary factories have affected Bangladesh: in 2005 a factory collapsed and caused the death of 64 people. In 2006, a series of fires killed 85 people and injured 207 others. In 2010, some 30 people died of asphyxiation and burns in two serious fires.

In 2006, tens of thousands of workers mobilized in one of the country's largest strike movements, affecting almost all of the 4,000 factories. The Bangladesh Garment Manufacturers and Exporters Association (BGMEA) used police forces to crack down. Three workers were killed, hundreds more were wounded by bullets, or imprisoned. In 2010, after a new strike movement, nearly 1,000 people were injured among workers as a result of the repression.

Cambodia
The garment industry in Cambodia represents the largest portion of the country's manufacturing sector, accounting for 80% of all exports. In 2012, exports grew to $4.61 billion, up 8% over 2011. In the first half of 2013, the Cambodian garment industry reported exports worth $1.56 billion. The sector employs 335,400 workers, of which 91% are female.

The sector operates largely in the final phase of garment production, that is turning yarns and fabrics into garments, as the country lacks a strong textile manufacturing base.

Ethiopia
Employees of Ethiopian garment factories, who work for brands such as Guess, H&M or Calvin Klein, receive a monthly salary of 26 dollars per month. These very low wages have led to low productivity, frequent strikes and high turnover. Some factories have replaced all their employees on average every 12 months, according to the 2019 report of the Stern Centre for Business and Human Rights at New York University.

The report states: "Rather than the docile and cheap labour force promoted in Ethiopia, foreign-based suppliers have met employees who are unhappy with their pay and living conditions and who want to protest more and more by stopping work or even quitting. In their eagerness to create a "made in Ethiopia" brand, the government, global brands and foreign manufacturers did not anticipate that the base salary was simply too low for workers to make a living from."

India
Indian clothing and apparel industry is one of the largest employment generating sector after agriculture in India and is sixth largest exporter in the world. India is the second largest producer of fibre in the world. Cotton is the most produced fibre in India. Other fibres produced in India include silk, wool, and jute. 60% of the Indian textile Industry is cotton based. Indian clothing industry dates back to Harappan civilisation and is one of the oldest clothing manufacturing industry in the world. India produces various types of clothing including woven and knitted clothing. Ahmedabad, Surat, Tiruppur, Mumbai, Bangalore, Delhi, Ludhiana and Chennai are important manufacturing centres of India.

Pakistan
The textile industry is the largest manufacturing industry in Pakistan, the fourth largest global producer of cotton, and the eighth largest exporter of textile products in Asia. It contributes to 8.5% of GDP and provides employment to 30% of the 56 million strong national workforce, or 40% of industrial employment. Punjab Province dominates the textile industry in Pakistan. Realising the economic and employment implications of non-compliance for Pakistan, the national government has developed an International Labour Standard (ILS) Compliance and Reporting Programme to improve workplace practices in the textile industry together with the ILO.

Retail
Fast fashion is a major source of retail sales for the clothing industry. Retailers do not typically manufacture their own items and henceforth they purchase their goods from wholesalers and manufactures. This makes it so that they can mark down there prices, and make them cheaper to consumers. This process is called a Supply Chain, which is the way in which companies and suppliers are able to distribute products to consumers. Fast-fashion based companies can quickly manufacture and distribute their designs. These quick made designs often result in extra waste, low-paid workers, and overconsumption. Fast fashion companies include Zara, Forever21, Old Navy, and Gap.

Sustainability and working conditions

The clothing industry has grown to an eco-friendly packaging solution to limit the amount of waste.  The regulator, Fast-Moving Consumer Goods (FMCG) companies, and retailers are contributing their efforts to the eco-friendly packaging commitment. China banned imports on packing waste in 2017, Canada implemented Zero Plastic Waste in 2018, and U.S introduced bills around reducing single use packing waste. The nonprofit organisation As You Sow produced a report in 2010 which argued that "apparel industry leaders have made changes to their purchasing practices ... to improve working conditions in factories".

Sustainable fashion takes into account the entire supply chain and life cycle of a garment, from where and how it is made to when it ends up in our landfills. It is important for consumers to think about how their purchase affects the environment, the lifecycle of their garment, and how to invest in clothes that last longer.
The article "An Exploration of Hybrid Fast Fashion and Domestic Manufacturing Models in Relocalised Apparel Production", by Anuj Desai, Nedal Nassar and Marian Chertow, it states, "sustainable apparel’ marketplace with a fast-fashion model that relies on a supply chain that matches shorter-cycle, flexible production with higher product differentiation".

Trade unions

Workers in the clothing industry are represented by a number of international and national trade unions.

See also
 Accord on Fire and Building Safety in Bangladesh
 Alliance for Bangladesh Worker Safety
 Clothing line
 Fashion industry
 Fashion design services
 Fast fashion
 Fashion accessory
 List of fabric names
 List of textile fibres
 Nylon riots
 Savile Row tailoring
 Shoemaking
 Sweatshop
 Tailor
 Textile
 Textile industry
 Uniforms

Further reading

United States
 Carpenter, Jesse Thomas. Competition and Collective Bargaining in the Needle Trades, 1910-67 (Cornell UP, 1972).
 Chandler, Alfred The Visible Hand: The Managerial Revolution in American Business (Harvard UP, 1977), pp 287, 289, 298, 308–09, 312.
 Cherington, Paul T. The Wool Industry: Commercial Problems of the American Woolen and Worsted Manufacture (1917) online
 Cole, Arthur H. "A neglected chapter in the history of combinations: The American wool manufacture." Quarterly Journal of Economics 37.3 (1923): 436–475.
 Copeland, Melvin Thomas. The cotton manufacturing industry of the United States (Harvard UP, 1912) online.
 Corbin, Harry A. The Men's Clothing Industry: Colonial Times Through Modern Times (New York, 1970).
 Fraser, Steve. Labor will rule: Sidney Hillman and the rise of American labor (Cornell UP, 1993) head of Amalgamated Clothing Workers of America.
 Godley, Andrew. Jewish immigrant entrepreneurship in New York and London 1880–1914. (Palgrave Macmillan, 2001).
 Goldstein, Gabriel M. and Elizabeth Greenberg, eds. A Perfect Fit: The Garment Industry and American Jewry (1860-1960) (Texas Tech UP, 2012), heavily illustrated
 Green, Nancy L. Ready-to-wear and ready-to-work: a century of industry and immigrants in Paris and New York (Duke UP, 1997).
 Haberland, Michelle. "Striking Beauties: Women Apparel Workers in the United States South, 1930-2000" (University of Georgia Press, 2015).
 Hapke, Laura. Sweatshop: the history of an American idea (Rutgers UP, 2004).
 Joselit, Jenna Weissman. A Perfect Fit: Clothes, Character, and the Promise of America (2002).
 Katz, Daniel. All together different: Yiddish socialists, garment workers, and the labor roots of multiculturalism (NYU Press, 2011).
 Liebhold, Peter, and Harry R. Rubenstein. Between a rock and a hard place: A history of American sweatshops, 1820-present (UCLA Asian American Studies Center, 1999).
 Nystrom, Paul. The Economics of Fashion (New York, 1928).
 Parmet, Robert D. The Master of Seventh Avenue The Master of Seventh Avenue David Dubinsky and the American Labor Movement (2012), head of the International Ladies' Garment Workers' Union (ILGWU)
 Pastorello, Karen. A power among them: Bessie Abramowitz Hillman and the making of the Amalgamated Clothing Workers of America (U of Illinois Press, 2008).
 Pope, Eliphalet. The Clothing Industry in New York (U of Missouri, 1905) online
 Popkin, Martin E. Organization, Management, and Technology in the Manufacture of Men's Clothing (New York, 1929)
 Seidman, Joel. The Needle Trades (1942)
 Tyson, Thomas. "Collective bargaining and cost accounting: the case of the US men's clothing industry", Accounting and Business Research 25.97 (1994): 23–38.

References

 
Industries (economics)